Al Sawadi (or simply Sawadi) is a resort town near Muscat, Oman. It is one of the most famous place in Oman. It has a beautiful beach. Many people like to spend their holiday in this place.

References

Populated places in Oman